Sylvie Testuz (born 4 June 1959) is a French former swimmer who competed in the 1976 Summer Olympics.

References

External links
 
 
 

1959 births
Living people
French female backstroke swimmers
Olympic swimmers of France
Swimmers at the 1976 Summer Olympics
Mediterranean Games gold medalists for France
Mediterranean Games medalists in swimming
Swimmers at the 1975 Mediterranean Games
21st-century French women
20th-century French women